Santo Antônio da Patrulha is a municipality in the Brazilian state of  Rio Grande do Sul. It was established in 1811.

See also
List of municipalities in Rio Grande do Sul
Marcos Christino Fioravanti

References

Municipalities in Rio Grande do Sul
1811 establishments in Brazil